Luna Lake may refer to:

Luna Lake (Arizona)
Luna Lake (Washington)